Winning Post 7 Maximum 2007 (ウイニングポスト7 マキシマム2007) is a horse racing simulator published by Koei for the PlayStation 2 and PlayStation 3 in Japan on March 29, 2007. It is the sequel of Winning Post 7 and is followed by Winning Post 7 Maximum 2008.

Premium Pack
A Winning Post 7 Maximum 2007 and G1 Jockey 4 2007 Premium Pack bundle for both the PlayStation 2 and PlayStation 3 versions was released on November 1, 2007.

See also
Winning Post 7 Maximum 2008
G1 Jockey 4 2007
G1 Jockey 4 2008

References

External links
Official website

2007 video games
Horse racing video games
Japan-exclusive video games
Koei games
PlayStation 2 games
PlayStation 3 games
Video games developed in Japan